Authentic Brands Group LLC (ABG) is an American brand management company headquartered in New York City. Its holdings include various apparel, athletics, and entertainment brands, for which it partners with other companies to license and merchandise. ABG owns more than 50 consumer brands, as well as the likeness rights or estates of celebrities, including Muhammad Ali, Elvis Presley, and Marilyn Monroe.

History
The company was founded in 2010 by Jamie Salter, after he stepped down as CEO of Hilco Consumer Capital, a company that was involved in the restructuring of struggling consumer brands (such as Bombay Company and Polaroid Corporation). Salter invested US$250 million in the new venture, and the majority of the equity was sold to Leonard Green & Partners. Two of ABG's first major purchases were the clothing brands Silver Star and Tapout. In January 2011, Authentic Brands Group acquired rights to the likeness of Marilyn Monroe.

In October 2013, ABG announced the purchase of Juicy Couture from Fifth & Pacific for US$195 million. The following month, ABG acquired the estate of Muhammad Ali, and CORE Media Group's 85% stake in Elvis Presley Enterprises (which includes the estate of Elvis Presley, likeness rights, and music publishing assets).

In December 2015, basketball player Shaquille O'Neal signed with ABG to manage his likeness and marketing rights. In September 2016, Julius Erving also sold his name and licensing rights to ABG, and Aéropostale was purchased out of bankruptcy by a consortium that included ABG and other investors.

In March 2017, ABG became the controlling partner of Greg Norman's consumer products business.

In March 2018, ABG announced that they would acquire Nautica from VF Corporation. On June 10, 2018, ABG announced that it was the winning bidder for the intellectual property of Nine West Holdings. The acquisition was completed on July 3, 2018. On October 10, 2018, ABG announced that it had entered into an agreement to purchase a majority stake in the intellectual property of the Camuto Group's proprietary brands in partnership with DSW Inc.

In May 2019, ABG announced its acquisition of sports magazine Sports Illustrated from Meredith Corporation for US$110 million. The company stated it planned to leverage its trademarks and other non-core assets in new ventures. Meredith will continue to publish the Sports Illustrated magazine and digital properties under license for at least two years. On June 18, 2019, it was announced that rights to publish the Sports Illustrated editorial operations would be licensed to The Maven under a 10-year deal, with Ross Levinsohn as CEO. In August 2019, BlackRock became the largest shareholder in Authentic Brands.

In May 2020, ABG and David Glasser's 101 Studios formed a joint venture, Sports Illustrated Studios, for feature film and television projects. The joint venture would have a slate of several TV series and films per year. The first announced project was the Covers two-hour docuseries based on the magazine's cover stories.

In August 2020, it was announced that Brooks Brothers was sold to ABG and Simon Property Group, the biggest mall operator in the US. The new owners committed to continue to operate at least 125 Brooks Brothers retail locations, worldwide (down from 424 global locations before the COVID-19 pandemic).

In June 2021, it was announced that ABG would acquire the Izod, Van Heusen, Arrow, and Geoffrey Beene brands from PVH.

In July 2021, ABG filed for an estimated US$1.5 billion initial public offering.

In August 2021, it was announced that ABG would be acquiring the sports clothing brand Reebok from Adidas for at least US$2.5 billion, in a deal expected to close in the first quarter of 2022. Private equity companies CVC Capital Partners and HPS Investment Partners invested $3.5 billion in ABG in a deal that closed in November 2021.  ABG announced they would delay the IPO until 2023 or 2024.

Portfolio

Notes

References

External links 

 

 
2010 establishments in New York City
American companies established in 2010
Branding companies of the United States
Conglomerate companies of the United States
CVC Capital Partners companies
Marketing companies established in 2010
Privately held companies based in New York City